San Pancrazio is a church in Florence, Italy, in Piazza San Pancrazio, behind Palazzo Rucellai. With the exception of the Rucellai Chapel, it is deconsecrated and is home to the museum dedicated to the sculptor Marino Marini. The Rucellai Chapel contains the Rucellai Sepulchre or Tempietto del Santo Sepolcro. Since February 2013 it has been possible to visit the chapel from within the Marini museum.

Early history
The church was built in the early Christian age, and is documented from 931; according to the historian Giovanni Villani, it was founded by Charlemagne. The adjoining Vallombrosian monastery was established in 1157. It was suppressed in 1808. The church was restored and enlarged from the 14th century. The cloister houses a fresco by Neri di Bicci.

The Rucellai Chapel

Giovanni di Paolo Rucellai commissioned Leon Battista Alberti to build him a tomb in the family chapel in the church. Giorgio Vasari wrote of it in 1568:

Alberti's work on the Rucellai Chapel and on the sepulchre within it probably began in about 1458; the origins of the chapel date to 1417, when the walls of the nave of San Pancrazio were built. According to the inscription above the door, the sepulchre was completed in 1467. The sepulchre is based on the Holy Sepulchre in the Anastasis in Jerusalem. The exterior is decorated with marble intarsiae; inside are the tombs of Giovanni Rucellai and members of his family, and a fresco by Alesso Baldovinetti.

Later history
The church was modified in the 18th and 19th centuries. From 1808, it was the seat of the city's lottery, then a tribunal, and then a tobacco factory.

Notes

References

Further reading

Pancrazio
Former Roman Catholic church buildings